Peter Maxwell Howley (born October 9, 1946) is an American pathologist, virologist, and professor at Harvard Medical School. He has been president of the American Society for Virology and the American Society for Investigative Pathology and a co-editor of the Annual Review of Pathology: Mechanisms of Disease.

Biography
Howley was born in New Brunswick, New Jersey. He graduated in 1968 from Princeton University with an A.B. in chemistry and in 1970 from Rutgers University with an M.M.S. (Master of Medical Science) degree. In 1972 he graduated with an M.D. from Harvard Medical School. From 1972 to 1973 he worked as an intern in pathology at Massachusetts General Hospital. He was a research associate from 1973 to 1975 at the National Institute of Allergy and Infectious Diseases (NIAID) in Bethesda, Maryland. In 1977 he was granted board certification in anatomic pathology. 
At the NIC's Laboratory of Pathology, Howell was from 1975 to 1976 a resident, from 1976 to 1977 a junior staff pathologist, from 1977 to 1979 a senior investigator, and from 1979 to 1984 Chief of the Viral Oncology and Molecular Pathology Section. From 1984 to 1993 he was Chief of the NIC's Laboratory of Tumor Virus Biology. In 1993 he became a professor of pathology at Harvard Medical School. He was the president of the American Society for Virology from 1998 to 1999 and the president of the American Society for Investigative Pathology in 2006.

He is considered to be a leader in research on papillomaviruses. Howley and his co-workers created gene maps of many species of papillomaviruses and analyzed their transcription patterns and systems of transcription regulation. The research identified papillomavirus oncogenes and the molecular mechanisms of their damaging effects. This work is considered fundamental for the understanding of the pathogenesis of papillomaviruses at the molecular level.

Peter M. Howley and David M. Knipe have been co-editors-in-chief, since the 3rd edition, of Fields Virology, a standard work on virology, with 5th edition published in 2006 and 6th edition published in 2013. Howley is also one of the chief editors of The Molecular Basis of Cancer, published by Elsevier.  He was a co-editor of the Annual Review of Pathology: Mechanisms of Disease from 2007–2015. He is a member of the editorial board of the ''Proceedings of the National Academy of Sciences.

He is married with three children.

Peter M. Howley should not be confused with Paul M. Howley, who is a managing director of the vaccine biotechnology firm VAXMED Pty Ltd in Melbourne, Australia.

Awards and honors
 1983 — Warner-Lamber/Parke-David Award of the American Society for Experimental Pathology
 1986 — Wallace P. Rowe Award of the National Institute of Allergy and Infectious Diseasesfor
 1993 — Member of the National Academy of Sciences
 1994 — Paul Ehrlich and Ludwig Darmstaedter Prize (also awarded to Harald zur Hausen)
 1996 — Fellow of the American Academy of Arts & Sciences
 2004 — Rous-Whipple Award of the American Society for Investigative Pathology
 2011 — Keynote speaker at the Convocation Ceremony of the Robert Wood Johnson Medical School

Selected publications
  1980
  1981
  1982
  1985
  1986
  1989
  1990
  1991
  1991
  1992
  1995
  1997
 
  1999

References

1946 births
Living people
People from New Brunswick, New Jersey
American pathologists
American virologists
20th-century American physicians
21st-century American physicians
Fellows of the American Academy of Arts and Sciences
Members of the United States National Academy of Sciences
Princeton University alumni
Rutgers University alumni
Harvard Medical School alumni
Harvard Medical School faculty
Annual Reviews (publisher) editors